Hawaii Route 240 is a state highway in Hawaii County, Hawaii, United States.

Route description

The highway is located on the island of Hawaii, and travels from southeast of the city of Honokaa northwest to Waimanu Natural Estuarine Research Reserve, on the coast of the island. The highway connects the settlement located by the Reserve to the main highway, Hawaii Route 19.

Major intersections

See also

References

External links

 0240
Transportation in Hawaii County, Hawaii